"A Fool Never Learns" is a song written by Sonny Curtis and performed by Andy Williams.  The song reached #4 on the U.S. adult contemporary chart, #13 on the Billboard chart, and #40 in the UK in 1964.  The song's A-side, "Charade", reached #100 on the Billboard Hot 100.

Chart performance

References

1963 singles
Songs written by Sonny Curtis
Andy Williams songs
Columbia Records singles
1963 songs
The Crickets songs